The 1913 Auburn Tigers football team represented Auburn University in the 1913 Southern Intercollegiate Athletic Association football season. The Tigers were retroactively recognized as a national champion by the Billingsley Report's alternative calculation which considers teams' margin of victory. The team was coached by Mike Donahue and was undefeated at 8–0, outscoring opponents 224–13.

Auburn was the champion of the Southern Intercollegiate Athletic Association. The team played just two games at home. Under Billingsley's primary methodology, Chicago was recognized as the national champion. Although it is a recognized national championship, Auburn does not claim the title, but does acknowledge it in its official media guide.

Before the season
Since Auburn's tie with Vanderbilt last year, teams other than Vanderbilt had a chance to win a title, and newspapers covered football more than the World Series for the first time.

Coach Donahue built his team around his defense, which played out of a 7–2–2 scheme. The team was led by senior captain Kirk Newell. One source reads "Coach Donahue loved the fullback dive and would run the play over and over again before sending the elusive Newell wide on a sweep."

Schedule

Season summary

Mercer
A.P.I. began its season with a 53-0 blowout against visiting Mercer on Drake Field.

Florida

Sources:

The week before, the Florida Gators had the largest win in their history, a 144–0 win over Florida Southern. Auburn crushed the Gators 55–0. Auburn scored five touchdowns in the first half. Captain Kirk Newell retired in the third period due to the heat.

The starting lineup was Wynne (left end), Esslinger (left tackle), Lockwood (left guard), Pitts (center), Thigpen (right guard), Louisell (right tackle), Robinson (right end), Arnold (quarterback), Newell (left halfback), Sparkman (right halfback), Harris (fullback).

Mississippi A&M
The second place Mississippi A&M Aggies fell to Auburn 34–0 after years of close games between the two schools.

Clemson
Clemson was defeated 20–0 with coach Donahue using his fullback.

The starting lineup was Wynne (left end), Esslinger (left tackle), Lockwood (left guard), Pitts (center), Thigpen (right guard), Louisell (right tackle), Robinson (right end), Arnold (quarterback), Newell (left halfback), Sparkman (right halfback), Harris (fullback).

LSU

Sources:

In a close game of conventional football, Auburn beat the LSU Tigers 7–0, with Tom Dutton standing out at center of defense. Kirk Newell starred with end runs, and in the third quarter brought the ball to the 12-yard line with a 40-yard run. Red Harris eventually made the deciding score.

The starting lineup was Taylor (left end), Louisell (left tackle), Thigpen (left guard), Pitts (center), Lockwood (right guard), Esslinger (right tackle), Robinson (right end), Arnold (quarterback), Newell (left halfback), Kearley (right halfback), Harris (fullback).

Georgia Tech
Auburn beat Georgia Tech 20–0, Auburn's sixth straight shutout. After the first half, Tech's line was beaten down by Auburn's.

Vanderbilt

Sources:

In "one of the most spectacular games the South ever saw", Auburn beat Dan McGugin's Vanderbilt Commodores 14–6. Auburn scored with fullback Hart. Vanderbilt responded quickly with a 30-yard pass from Ammie Sikes to Hord Boensch. Using four different fullbacks on one drive, Auburn drove 80 yards to win.

Georgia

Sources:

The Tigers defeated the Georgia Bulldogs 21–7 to claim the SIAA title. Many prominent persons, including the governor, saw the contest.

Kirk Newell of Auburn and Bob McWhorter of Georgia played their last games. At the 25-yard line, from a freak formation, Georgia's David Paddock pass the ball to Logan who caught it on the run and into the endzone for the first score of the game. Red Harris got over a score in the second period. In the third quarter, Auburn had driven to the 11-yard line, and Donahue pulled Harris for Christopher. The Georgia team expected a buck, and committed to stopping it. Newell skirted around right end for 7 yards.  Christopher eventually plunged in from the 4-yard line. Later, from the 35-yard line, Newell had a run to the 7-yard line, chased out of bounds by McWhorter. Christopher again got the touchdown.

The starting lineup was Kearley (left end), Louisell (left tackle), Thigpen (left guard), Pitts (center), Lockwood (right guard), Esslinger (right tackle), Robinson (right end), Arnold (quarterback), Newell (left halfback), Prendergast (right halfback), Harris (fullback).

Postseason
Newell gained 1,707 yards that year, 46% of the team's entire offensive output; and 5,800 yards rushing, 350 yards receiving, and 1,200 yards on punt returns for his career.  One writer claims "Auburn had a lot of great football teams, but there may not have been one greater than the 1913–1914 team." Newell went on to be a World War I hero and member of the Alabama Sports Hall of Fame.

Roster

Starters

Line

Backfield

Subs

Staff
Mike Donahue, coach
George Penton, assistant
Ed Bragg, alumni coach
Jonathan Bell Lovelace, manager
Thomas Bragg, graduate manager
Dean Cliff Hare, faculty chairman of athletics

References

Additional sources
 

Auburn
Auburn Tigers football seasons
College football undefeated seasons
Auburn Tigers football